Nicolás de Piérola District is one of eight districts of the province Camaná.

See also 
 Wamp'uy

References

Districts of the Camaná Province
Districts of the Arequipa Region